Dyrkøb (lit. " Expensive Purchase") is a street in the Old Town of Copenhagen, Denmark. It runs along the south side of Church of Our Lady, linking Nørregade in the west with Fiolstræde in the east. Kunstnerkollegiet, a dormitory from 1815 designed by Christian Frederik Hansen, is located at the corner with Fiolstræde.

History

The street takes its name after a property owned by a wine seller which was referred to as Dyrkøb in 1622. The reason for the name is unknown but may either be that the wine seller had acquired the house at a high price or that he sold his wines expensively. The house was later owned by Abraham Lahn but demolished in  1699 to make way for an expansion of Church of Our Lady's graveyard.  The graveyard disappeared and the street was established after Assistens Cemetery was established in Nørrebro in 1760. Church of Our Lady and the surrounding buildings were destroyed during the British bombardment of Copenhagen in 1807. The street was rebuilt in the 1810s.

Notable buildings and residents

Trøstens Bolig (No. 1), on the corner with Fiolstræde, was built as charitable housing for indigent craftsmen. It was designed by Christian Frederik Hansen who was also in charge of the rebuilding of Church of Our Lady as well as Metropolitan School on the other side of Fiolstræde. In 1854, it was taken over by Soldins Stiftelse and used as charitable housing for indigent widows and unmarried women. The building has since 1974 served as a dormitory for students at the Royal Danish Academy of Fine Arts under the name Kunstnerkollegiet.  

Dyrkøb 3-7 are all listed. No. 5 was built in 1812–14 for royal chimney sweeper J. S. Starrinsky. No. 3 was built as one storey in  1813-1814 but expanded with three floors in 1850–51. The 3-bay house at No. 7 is from 1885.

Public art
At the beginning of the street stands a bronze cast of Jean Arp's non-figurative sculpture Cupulate Fruit from 1960. It was installed at the site in 1979 as a gift from Carl Jacobsen's Albertina Foundation.

References

External links

 Dyrkøb at indenforvoldene.dk

Streets in Copenhagen